The 12735/36 Secunderabad Yesvantpur Garib Rath Express is a Superfast Express train of the Garib Rath series belonging to Indian Railways - South Central Railway zone that runs between Secunderabad Junction and Yesvantpur Junction in India.

It operates as train number 12735 from Secunderabad Junction to Yesvantpur Junction and as train number 12736 in the reverse direction serving the states of Telangana, Karnataka & Andhra Pradesh.

It is part of the Garib Rath Express series launched by the former railway minister of India, Laloo Prasad Yadav.

Coaches

The 12735 / 36 Secunderabad Yesvantpur Garib Rath Express has 14 AC 3 tier & 2 End on Generator Coaches . It does not carry a Pantry car coach .

As is customary with most train services in India, Coach Composition may be amended at the discretion of Indian Railways depending on demand.

Service

Its fare includes a Superfast surcharge.

Routeing

The 12735 / 36 Secunderabad Yesvantpur Garib Rath Express runs from Secunderabad Junction via Kulluru, Gooty Junction, Dharmavaram Junction, Hindupur to Yesvantpur Junction.

Traction

Will be diverted via ; GY KLU from 08/11/17 to 31/03/18. Will run with E-loco end to end from Secunderabad wef 08/11/17, a Lallaguda  based WAP 7 locomotive powers the train for its entire journey.

Before 8 November 2017, this train was hauled by a Kazipet based WDM-3A
from End to End.

Operation

12735 Secunderabad Yesvantpur Garib Rath Express leaves Secunderabad Junction every Monday, Wednesday & Friday arriving Yesvantpur Junction the next day .

12736 Yesvantpur Secunderabad Garib Rath Express leaves Yesvantpur Junction every Tuesday, Thursday & Sunday arriving Secunderabad Junction the next day .

References 

 https://web.archive.org/web/20151213212015/http://www.indianrail.gov.in/garibrath_trn_list.html
 http://timesofindia.indiatimes.com/city/hubli/Secunderabad-Yeshwantpur-Garibrath-Expresss-timings-changed/articleshow/21981447.cms
 https://www.youtube.com/watch?v=b04V1YJTTAk
 http://www.scr.indianrailways.gov.in/cris//uploads/files/1357731361248-Catering%20On%20Board.pdf
 http://www.thehindu.com/todays-paper/tp-national/tp-andhrapradesh/garib-rath-to-bangalore-flagged-off/article1192433.ece

External links

Transport in Secunderabad
Transport in Bangalore
Railway services introduced in 2008
Garib Rath Express trains
Rail transport in Telangana
Rail transport in Karnataka
Rail transport in Andhra Pradesh